Samy Houri (born 9 August 1985 in Asnières-sur-Seine) is a French footballer currently playing for Belfort in the Championnat National.

Career 
-1999 : Entente Sannois Saint-Gratien
2001–2002 :  AS Saint-Étienne (L2)
2002–2003 :  AS Saint-Étienne (CFA)
2003–2004 : AS Saint-Étienne  (L2)
2004–2005 :  AS Saint-Étienne (L1)
2005–2006 :  AS Saint-Étienne  (L1)
2006–2007 :  AS Saint-Étienne (Championnat National) (loan)
2007–2008 : Paris FC (Championnat National) (loan)
2008–2009 :  AS Saint-Étienne (L1)

Titles 
 Champion in Ligue 2 in 2004 AS Saint-Étienne
 Premier match in Ligue 1 : 11 January 2006, FC Metz – AS Saint-Étienne (0–1)
 June 2001 : 3e du Tournoi de Salerne
 February 2002 : 2e du Tournoi de l'Atlantique
 May 2002 : Vice-Champion d'Europe des Months de 17 ans

Statistics 
3 matches in L1
6 matches in L2
65 matches (12 buts) in National
79 matches (10 buts) in CFA

External links

References

1985 births
Living people
People from Asnières-sur-Seine
French footballers
AS Saint-Étienne players
Ligue 1 players
Ligue 2 players
French sportspeople of Algerian descent
French sportspeople of Moroccan descent
Paris FC players
AC Arlésien players
French expatriate footballers
Expatriate footballers in Belgium
K.V. Oostende players
Entente SSG players
Challenger Pro League players
CS Constantine players
US Raon-l'Étape players
Association football midfielders
Footballers from Hauts-de-Seine